Amphimedon lamellata is a species of sponge in the family Niphatidae, first described by Jane Fromont in 1993, from a specimen collected at a depth of 9 m, from Macgillivray Reef,  Lizard Island in the Great Barrier Reef.

Distribution & Habitat 
It is found from Lizard Island to the Whitsundays on the Great Barrier Reef, on reef slopes at depths of 10-15 m, attached to rocky substrata.

References

Haplosclerina
Taxa described in 1993
Taxa named by Jane Fromont